Al-Helal Islami Academy & College is a private higher secondary school in Sapahar, Naogaon District, Bangladesh.

See also
 Sapahar Government College 
 Sapahar Pilot High School, Naogaon

References

Schools in Naogaon District
High schools in Bangladesh
1995 establishments in Bangladesh
Colleges in Naogaon District